is the twenty-third video album by Japanese singer-songwriter Mai Kuraki. It was released through Northern Music on June 24, 2020. The video album was originally set for release on April 29, 2020 but was delayed due to the COVID-19 pandemic. The release features Kuraki's performance during her 20th Anniversary Mai Kuraki Live Project 2019 "Let's Goal!: Barairo no Jinsei" Tour in Tokyo on October 26, 2019.

Track listing

Charts

Release history

References 

Mai Kuraki albums
2020 video albums
2020 live albums
Live video albums